The women's 10 metre platform, also reported as high diving, was one of four diving events on the Diving at the 1964 Summer Olympics programme.

The competition was split into two phases:

Preliminary round (15 October)
Divers performed three compulsory dives with limited degrees of difficulty and one voluntary dive without limits. The twelve divers with the highest scores advanced to the final.
Final (15 October)
Divers performed one compulsory dive with limited degrees of difficulty and two voluntary dives without limits. The final ranking was determined by the combined score with the preliminary round.

Results

Notes

References
 
 

Women
1964
1964 in women's diving
Div